The  is the name of a short section of railway line that was originally a branch line before a section of it was upgraded and became part of the Yosan Line. The line is operationally part of the Yosan Line, and retains it separate name due to the Japanese naming convention which requires a formal change of name, which has not occurred in this case.

Services
The line is served by Limited Express trains between Okayama (Shiokaze trains, one round-trip a day), Takamatsu (Ishizuchi trains, two Takamatsu-bound trains a day) or Matsuyama (Uwakai trains, 14 return trips and two Uwajima-bound trains a day) and Uwajima, and Local trains between Matsuyama or Iyoshi and Iyo-Ōzu, Yawatahama or Uwajima.

Stations

History

That day, the line from Gorō to Uchiko gained its own identity as the Uchiko Line. 

Freight operations ceased on December 1, 1971. 

On November 25, 1985, the line was closed and the passenger service was replaced by buses to allow heavier rails to be laid, the railbed to be strengthened, and curves to be relaxed. The next year, on March 3, the line between Uchiko and Niiya, together with new sections of the Yosan Main Line from Mukaibara and Niiya to Iyo-Ōzu, opened as a shortcut route between Matsuyama and Uwajima, with new passing facilities at Niiya, relocated stations at Uchiko and Ikazaki, and Centralised Traffic Control. The section from Niiya to Gorō was closed. 

In 1987 JNR was regionalised and privatised, and the Uchiko Line came under the control of Shikoku Railway Company, with Japan Freight Railway Company operating services on the line. JR Freight subsequently ceased to run services on the line on April 1, 2006.

References

Lines of Shikoku Railway Company
Railway lines opened in 1920
1067 mm gauge railways in Japan
2 ft 6 in gauge railways in Japan